Nikole is a given name. Notable people with the name include:

Nikole Beckwith, American actress
Nikole Hannah-Jones (born 1976), American journalist
Nikole Lewis, American researcher
Nikole Lowe (born 1973), New Zealand tattoo artist
Nikole Mitchell (born 1974), Jamaican Olympic athlete
Nikole Schrepfer (born 1964), Swiss swimmer
Nikole Zivalich (born 1987), American journalist

See also
Sveti Nikole, town in the Republic of Macedonia
Sveti Nikole Municipality, municipality in eastern Republic of Macedonia